Chelsea Building Society is a trading name of Yorkshire Building Society based in Bradford, West Yorkshire. Chelsea merged with the Yorkshire in 2010, at which point Chelsea was the fourth largest building society in the United Kingdom, with assets in excess of £13 billion and 35 branches, mainly in the southern areas of England, particularly in London.

Chelsea now forms part of the Yorkshire Building Society Group, alongside Yorkshire Building Society and the Norwich and Peterborough Building Society. In January 2016, Yorkshire Building Society announced that seven of the Chelsea's branches would close, with the remainder rebranded as Yorkshire. This essentially means Chelsea is an online only brand and currently provides basic savings accounts and mortgage products.

History 

Chelsea was first established in 1875 as the London & Camberwell Building Society. Three years later, in 1878, the Borough of Chelsea Permanent Building Society was formed. Over the years both societies merged with smaller societies and on 31 December 1966 the two societies merged to create a new society with assets of £30 million. The new society was called the Chelsea and South London Building Society until April 1971 when the name was changed to Chelsea Building Society.

It was a member of the Building Societies Association and operated mainly in South East England with a network of 35 branches.

Following the merger in 1966, the administrative headquarters were in Streatham, with the registered office at 110 Kings Road, Chelsea. In 1973, having outgrown the accommodation at Streatham, the administrative headquarters moved to Thirlestaine Hall in Cheltenham. On 1 July 1988 Chelsea completed a merger with the City of London Building Society, with the name Chelsea remaining unaffected.

In 2005 Chelsea opened a purpose-built customer contact centre close to the Head Office at the former Charlton Kings railway station as a commitment to keep its call centres UK based, which won environmental awards for its use of geothermal heating, green building and "green" credentials. Its two offices in Cheltenham employed over eight hundred staff.

In February 2007 the society acquired Britannia Capital Securities, a medium-sized independent firm of secured loan and mortgage brokers operating in the UK, in order to further diversify their lending. The society remained operational during the 2007 United Kingdom floods, despite having no running water for several weeks.

On 7 June 2008 it was announced by both Catholic Building Society and Chelsea Building Society that they were to merge.
The merger between the Chelsea and the Catholic Building Society completed on 31 December 2008.

Merger with the Yorkshire Building Society 
On 1 December 2009, Chelsea announced that it was in advanced merger talks with Yorkshire Building Society. The following day they announced a formal merger. At a Special General Meeting in Bradford on 23 January 2010, Yorkshire Building Society members approved the merger proposal.

The merger completed on 1 April 2010. Shortly afterwards, Yorkshire announced the closure of Chelsea's operational presence at the original Cheltenham Head Office in Thirlestaine Road by 2011, relocating the remaining staff to the second, smaller site at the former Charlton Kings railway station. The Thirlestaine Hall site was acquired in 2012 to build a gated housing estate and care home, known as Thirlestaine Park. Much of what Chelsea had constructed to accommodate its business needs was demolished and the Grade 2 listed Thirlestaine Hall was converted into luxury flats, with the copper-domed observatory preserved.

In January 2016, it was announced that seven of the Chelsea's branches would close by September, with the rest to be rebranded under the Yorkshire brand. Products and services under the Chelsea brand would continue to be available online and by telephone.

The second smaller Head Office site gradually reduced its staff as it transitioned functions to the Yorkshire Head Office in Bradford. The Charlton Kings offices were officially closed at the end of 2019. It was later sold to Spirax-Sarco Engineering who moved into the building in 2021.

Factors leading to the merger with the Yorkshire
As the Financial crisis of 2007–2008 intensified, several of Chelsea's weaknesses in its business model and risks that it had taken in preceding years began to affect the financial stability of the Society.
 
On 10 October 2008, Chelsea revealed £55 million of its liquid assets (1.55%) were invested in the troubled Icelandic banks. While the amount involved was only a small percentage of assets, it represented almost one year's operating profit for Chelsea. 

In response to the Financial crisis the Bank of England drastically cut the Base Rate. This generally results in lenders reducing the rates they pay on their savings products and lowering the rates charged to borrowers. However, Chelsea had for several years focused on offering fixed-rate bonds to its savers. Many of them market-leading and regularly appearing in "best buys". On the one hand this helped the Society to plan longer-term by securing money for a fixed period at a fixed rate. However some of these bonds were paying in excess of 6%, meaning due to the unforeseen cut in the Base Rate they were now costing Chelsea money.

In February 2007, Chelsea had brought Britannia Capital Securities to further develop its lending into Sub Prime markets.  Once the Financial crisis took hold this had two negative consequences. Firstly, the business had been brought at a high cost, and due to the broader financial crisis, Sub Prime lending was effectively banned due to its high risk. Therefore, the purchase of Britannia Capital Securities did not provide the Society with the profit and return on the investment they had hoped for. Secondly, the customers who had already taken out sub prime loans and mortgages were essentially customers with previous credit issues and were more likely to default on loans than prime customers, especially during a recession. This was a long-term uncertainty that Chelsea had to take into consideration and make provisions for.

In August 2009 it was revealed Chelsea had written off £41m in "potentially fraudulent loans", mainly from its Buy to Let mortgage book which had been underwritten between 2006 and 2008. Although Chelsea wasn't the only lender to be targeted by Buy to Let fraud, its lending criteria and poor due diligence on the properties it was loaning money on, had allowed it to take place.

Although Chelsea had made an underlying operating profit that year of £18m and the fraudulent loans did not necessarily equate to a £41m loss  by writing off the fraudulent loans it caused the Society to report an overall loss for the second year running.

The above issues caused confidence in the Society to fall, both with members and rating agencies such as Moody's Corporation who downgraded their rating to "Baa3". This lower rating made it significantly more challenging for the Society to attract deposits. 

Due to the ongoing issues, the Chief Executive, Richard Hornbrook, left the Society and a temporary Chief Executive, Stuart Bernau, was appointed in August 2009. His role was also to conduct a systematic review of Chelsea's future. The findings were announced to the press in the week beginning 30 November 2009, which ultimately recommended that a merger with Yorkshire would be in the best interests of the Society and its members.

In comparison, for many years, Yorkshire had focused primarily on traditional lending and did not have as much exposure to the risks that Chelsea did. With large reserves of liquidity, they were in an good financial position to acquire several Societies through mergers. Chelsea still had a strong reputation and was particularly attractive as it had an extensive branch network in the south of England, where in comparison, Yorkshire had only a minimal presence.

The boards of both Societies mutually agreed a merger would be beneficial to both Societies and recommended members approve the proposal, which they ultimately did, becoming effective on 1 April 2010.

References

External links

Building Societies Association
KPMG Building Societies Database 2008 
 

Former building societies of the United Kingdom
Banks established in 1875
Organizations established in 1875
Companies based in Cheltenham
1875 establishments in England